Smithy is a 1924 American silent film starring Stan Laurel.

Cast
 Stan Laurel - Smithy
 James Finlayson - Sergeant
 William Gillespie - The Boss
 Glenn Tryon - Mr. Smith
 Jack Ackroyd - (uncredited)
 Eddie Baker - (uncredited)
 Sammy Brooks - Man in Employment Line (uncredited)
 Jack Gavin - Foreman (uncredited)
 Ena Gregory - Secretary (uncredited)
 Charlie Hall - (uncredited)
 Fred Karno Jr. - Worker (uncredited)
 Marvin Loback - Worker (uncredited)
 George Rowe - Worker (uncredited)

See also
 List of American films of 1924

References

External links

1924 films
1924 comedy films
1924 short films
American silent short films
American black-and-white films
Films directed by George Jeske
Silent American comedy films
American comedy short films
1920s American films